The long-snouted barb (Puntius dorsalis) is a species of ray-finned fish in the genus Puntius. It is found in India and Sri Lanka.

References 

Puntius
Taxa named by Thomas C. Jerdon
Fish described in 1849
Fish of India
Fish of Sri Lanka